Azygophleps equatorialis is a moth in the family Cossidae. It was found in the Republic of the Congo.

References

Moths described in 2011
Azygophleps